Ioan Mărginean (born 13 October 1960) is a Romanian former football defender. He was part of Dinamo București's team that reached the semi-finals in the 1983–84 European Cup season. After he ended his playing career, Mărginean worked as a club official for various clubs: Unirea Alba Iulia (1992–2000, president), Extensiv Craiova (2000–2002, vice-president), FC Brașov (2003–2004, vice-president), Ceahlăul Piatra Neamț (2005–2008, vice-president), Universitatea Cluj (2008–2015, president), Gaz Metan Mediaș (2016–2020, president).

Honours
Dinamo București
Divizia A: 1981–82, 1982–83, 1983–84
Cupa României: 1981–82, 1983–84

Notes

References

1960 births
Living people
Romanian footballers
Romania under-21 international footballers
Association football defenders
Liga I players
Liga II players
FC Dinamo București players
CS Corvinul Hunedoara players
CSM Unirea Alba Iulia players
Romanian sports executives and administrators
People from Cugir